Thorne Waterside railway station, sometimes referred to as "Thorne Lock" because of its location, was built by the South Yorkshire Railway as the terminus of its line from Doncaster. It was the first railway station to be opened in Thorne. The line was opened for goods traffic on 11 December 1855 and to passenger services on 7 July 1856. The station was built adjacent to the Stainforth to Keadby Canal and goods traffic was trans-shipped for forwarding on.

Passenger services lasted for around 3 years before being transferred to a new station, officially called "Thorne" but usually referred to as Thorne (Old) railway station, near the town centre. A third station, Thorne South, on the "straightened" replaced this from 1864, and is still open for business.

References 
The South Yorkshire Railway, D.L.Franks,1971, Turntable Enterprises. 

Disused railway stations in Doncaster
Thorne, South Yorkshire
Former South Yorkshire Railway stations
Railway stations in Great Britain opened in 1856
Railway stations in Great Britain closed in 1859